Gum 15 is a  nebula from the Gum catalog, located in the constellation of Vela, about 3,000 light-years from Earth. It is shaped by aggressive winds flowing from the stars within and around it. The bright star in the center of the nebula is HD 74804, a double star.

References

H II regions
Vela (constellation)